The Central District of Azna County is a district (bakhsh) in Azna County, Lorestan Province, Iran. At the 2006 census, its population was 58,680, in 13,685 families.  The District has two Rural Districts (dehestan): Pachehlak-e Gharbi Rural District and Silakhor-e Sharqi Rural District. The District has one city: Azna.

References 

Districts of Lorestan Province
Azna County